During World War II, the United States Navy had a large contingent of operations based on land.

Academies
Naval Academy Preparatory School, United States Naval Training Center Bainbridge

Advisors
 Naval Advisor, War Production Board Office, Baltimore, Maryland
 Naval Advisor to Contract Distribution, Branch Office, War Production Board. Little Rock, Arkansas
 Naval Advisor to Division of Contract Distribution, War Production Board, Birmingham, Alabama
 Naval Advisor to War Production Board, Indianapolis, Indiana
 Naval Advisor to the War Production Board, Birmingham, Alabama
 Naval Advisor to the War Production Board, New Orleans, Louisiana
 Naval Advisor to the War Production Board, Springfield, Massachusetts
 Naval Advisor, War Production Board, Little Rock, Arkansas

Air Centers
 Naval Air Center, Hampton Roads, Virginia
 Naval Air Center, Hawaii
 Naval Air Center, San Diego, California
 Naval Air Center, Seattle, Washington

Air Facilities
 Naval Air Facility Attu, Alaska
 Naval Air Facility Columbus, Ohio
 Naval Air Facility Middle River, Maryland
 Naval Air Facility Newport, Rhode Island
 Naval Air Facility United States Naval Academy, Annapolis, Maryland

Air Stations
 Naval Air Station Astoria, Oregon
 Naval Air Station Banana River, Florida
 Naval Air Station Brunswick, Maine
 Naval Air Station Bunker Hill, Indiana
 Naval Air Station Cape May, New Jersey
 Naval Air Station Charleston, South Carolina
 Naval Air Station Clinton, Oklahoma
 Naval Air Station Coco Solo, Panama
 Naval Air Station Conroe, Texas
 Naval Air Station Dallas, Texas
 Naval Air Station Daytona Beach, Florida
 Naval Air Station Elizabeth City, North Carolina
 Naval Air Station Galveston, Texas
 Naval Air Station Grosse Ile, Michigan
 Naval Air Station Hitchcock, Texas
 Naval Air Station Houma, Louisiana
 Naval Air Station Hutchinson, Kansas
 Naval Air Station Isla Grande, Puerto Rico
 Naval Air Station Jacksonville, Florida
 Naval Air Station Key West, Florida
 Naval Air Station Klamath Falls, Oregon
 Naval Air Station Lakehurst, New Jersey
 Naval Air Station Litchfield Park, Arizona
 Naval Air Station New York
 Naval Air Station Memphis, Tennessee
 Naval Air Station Miami, Florida
 Naval Air Station New Orleans, Louisiana
 Naval Air Station Norfolk, Virginia
 Naval Air Station Norman, Oklahoma
 Naval Air Station Oceana, Virginia Beach, Virginia
 Naval Air Station Olathe, Kansas
 Naval Air Station Ottumwa, Iowa
 Naval Air Station Pasco, Washington
 Naval Air Station Patuxent River, Maryland
 Naval Air Station Quonset Point, Rhode Island
 Naval Air Station Richmond, Florida
 Naval Air Station Roosevelt Roads, Puerto Rico
 Naval Air Station San Diego, California
 Naval Air Station San Pedro, California
 Naval Air Station San Juan, Puerto Rico (see Naval Air Station Isla Grande)
 Naval Air Station Seattle, Washington
 Naval Air Station South Weymouth, Massachusetts
 Naval Air Station Squantum, Massachusetts
 Naval Air Station Tillamook, Oregon
 Naval Air Station Tongue Point, Oregon
 Naval Air Station Whidbey Island, Washington

Air Training

Bases
 Naval Air Training Bases, Corpus Christi, Texas

Centers
 Naval Air Training Center, Corpus Christi, Texas
 Naval Air Training Center, Pensacola, Florida

Intermediate
 Naval Air Intermediate Training, Pensacola, Florida

Primary
 Naval Air Primary Training, Kansas City, Kansas

Technical
 Naval Air Technical Training (Chicago, Illinois)
 Naval Air Technical Training Center (Memphis, Tennessee)
 Naval Air Technical Training Center (Norman, Oklahoma)

Air Delivery
 Naval Aircraft Delivery Unit, Port Columbus, Ohio

Airship Supply
 Naval Airship Supply Center, Naval Air Station Lakehurst, New Jersey

Ammunition Depots
 Naval Ammunition Depot, Charleston, Goose Creek, South Carolina
 Naval Ammunition Depot, Crane, Crane, Indiana
 Naval Ammunition Depot, Dover, Dover (Lake Denmark), New Jersey
 Naval Ammunition Depot, Earle, Earle, New Jersey
 Naval Ammunition Depot, Hastings, Hastings, Nebraska
 Naval Ammunition Depot, New Orleans, New Orleans, Louisiana
 Naval Ammunition Depot, Puget Sound, Puget Sound, Washington
 Naval Ammunition Depot, Sabana Seca, Puerto Rico

Ammunition

Schools

Handling
 Naval Ammunition Handling School, Hingham, Massachusetts

Packaging
 Naval Ammunition Packaging School (Palletizing), Hingham, Massachusetts

Laboratories
 Naval Materials Handling Laboratory, Hingham, Massachusetts

Amphibious Training Bases
 Naval Amphibious Training Base Fort Pierce, Fort Pierce, Florida
 Naval Amphibious Training Base Solomons Island, Solomons Island, Maryland

Attaches
 Naval Attache, London

Auxiliary Air Facilities
 Naval Auxiliary Air Facility Ayer, Massachusetts
 Naval Auxiliary Air Facility Bar Harbor, Maine
 Naval Auxiliary Air Facility Beverly, Massachusetts
 Naval Auxiliary Air Facility Creeds, Virginia Beach, Virginia
 Naval Auxiliary Air Facility Fentress, Virginia Beach, Virginia
 Naval Auxiliary Air Facility Groton, Connecticut
 Naval Auxiliary Air Facility Hyannis, Massachusetts
 Naval Auxiliary Air Facility Lakeview, Oregon
 Naval Auxiliary Air Facility Lewiston, Maine
 Naval Auxiliary Air Facility Long Island, Casco Bay, Maine
 Naval Auxiliary Air Facility Martha's Vineyard, Massachusetts
 Naval Auxiliary Air Facility Monogram, Driver, Virginia
 Naval Auxiliary Air Facility Nantucket, Massachusetts
 Naval Auxiliary Air Facility New Bedford, Massachusetts
 Naval Auxiliary Air Facility Otis Field, Camp Edwards, Massachusetts
 Naval Auxiliary Air Facility Sanford, Maine
 Naval Auxiliary Air Station-Arlington, Washington
 Naval Auxiliary Air Station Charlestown, Rhode Island
 Naval Auxiliary Air Station, Clatsop County, Oregon
 Naval Auxiliary Air Station, Corvallis, Oregon
 Naval Auxiliary Air Station, North Bend, Oregon
 Naval Auxiliary Air Facility Pungo, Virginia Beach, Virginia
 Naval Auxiliary Air Station, Quillayute, Washington
 Naval Auxiliary Air Station, Rodd Field, Texas
 Naval Auxiliary Air Station, Shelton, Washington

Aviation Supply Offices
 Naval Aviation Supply Office, Philadelphia, Philadelphia, Pennsylvania

Bases
 Naval Station Argentia, Argentia, Newfoundland
 Naval Base, Bermuda
 Naval Base, Cape May, Cape May, New Jersey
 Naval Base Cavite, Cavite, Philippine Islands
 Naval Base, Chagaramus, Chagaramus, Trinidad
 Charleston Naval Base, North Charleston, South Carolina
 Naval Base, Funafuti, Funafuti, Ellice Islands
 Naval Base, Newport, Newport, Rhode Island
 Norfolk Naval Base, Norfolk, Virginia
 Naval Weapons Station Yorktown, Yorktown, Virginia
 Naval Base, Pearl Harbor, Hawaii

Cargo Handling
 Naval Cargo Handling Unit, South Boston, South Boston, Massachusetts

Code and Signal
 Naval Code and Signal Laboratory, Washington, D.C.

Commands
 Naval Air Training Command (NATC), Patuxent River, Maryland
 Naval Air Intermediate Training Command, Corpus Christi, Texas.
 Naval Air Operational Training Command, Jacksonville, Florida
 Naval Air Primary Training Command, Fairfax Airport, Kansas City, Kansas
 Naval Airship Training Command, Lakehurst, New Jersey
 Naval Command, Office of Strategic Services, Washington, D.C.

Computing
 Naval Computing Machine Laboratory, National Cash Register Co., Dayton, Ohio

Construction Training
 Naval Construction Training Center, Quaddy Village, Maine
 Naval Construction Training Center, Davisville, Rhode Island

Convalescent Hospitals
 Naval Convalescent Hospital, Glenwood Springs, Colorado
 Naval Convalescent Hospital, Springfield, Massachusetts

Dental
 Naval Dental School, Bethesda, Maryland

Dispensary
 Naval Dispensary, Boston, Massachusetts
 Naval Dispensary, Solomons Island, Maryland
 Naval Dispensary, Woods Hole, Massachusetts
 Naval Dispensary, Miami Beach, Florida

Dry Docks
 Naval Dry Dock, Navy Yard, Boston, Massachusetts
 Naval Dry Dock, South Boston, Massachusetts

Fuel

Annexs
 Naval Fuel Annex, Navy Supply Pier, Portland, Maine
 Naval Fuel Annex, Navy Yard, Boston, Massachusetts

Depots
 Naval Fuel Depot, Boston, Massachusetts
 Naval Fuel Depot, Orient Heights, East Boston, Massachusetts
 Naval Fuel Depot, Puget Sound, Manchester, Washington

Hospitals
 Naval Hospital, Chelsea, Massachusetts
 Naval Hospital Corps School (WR), Bethesda, Maryland

Hydrographic Offices
 Naval Hydrographic Distributing Office, New Orleans, Louisiana

Ordnance Inspectors
 Naval Inspector of Ordnance, Bethlehem Steel, Quincy, Massachusetts
 Naval Inspector of Ordnance, Excell Foundry and Machine, Fall River, Massachusetts
 Naval Inspector of Ordnance, Quincy, Massachusetts

Intelligence
 Naval Intelligence Office, Naval Reserve Armory, Indianapolis, Indiana
 Naval Liaison Office, Monroe, Louisiana
 Naval Local Defense Force, Boston Section, Boston, Massachusetts
 Naval Magazine, Theodore, Alabama

Material Handling
 Naval Materials Handling Laboratory, Hingham, Massachusetts

Medical Work
 Naval Medical Research Institute, Bethesda, Maryland
 Naval Medical School, Bethesda, Maryland
 Naval Medical Storehouse, New Orleans, Louisiana

Mine Work
 Naval Mine Defense Laboratory, Panama City, Florida
 Naval Mine Development Detachment, Key West, Florida
 Naval Mine Test Facilities, Provincetown, Massachusetts

Schools
 Naval Mine Warfare School, North Charleston, South Carolina
 Naval Mine Warfare School, Yorktown, Virginia

Test Stations
 Naval Mine Warfare Test Station, Solomons Island, Maryland

Monitoring Stations
 Naval Monitoring Station, New Orleans, Louisiana

Net

Depots
 Naval Net Depot, Boston, Massachusetts
 Naval Net Depot, Indian Island, Washington
 Naval Net Depot, Manchester, Washington
 Naval Net Depot, Puget Sound, Washington

Schools
 Naval Net School, Tiburon, California

Observatory
 Naval Observatory, Washington, D.C.

Operating Base
 Naval Operating Base, Key West, Florida
 Naval Operating Base, Newport, Rhode Island

Ordnance

Laboratories
 Naval Ordnance Laboratory Annex, White Oak, Silver Spring, Maryland
 Naval Ordnance Laboratory Experimental Facilities, South River, Maryland
 Naval Ordnance Laboratory, Washington, D.C.

Plants
 Naval Ordnance Plant, Indianapolis, Indiana
 Naval Ordnance Plant, Louisville, Kentucky
 Naval Ordnance Plant, Shumaker, Arkansas

Test Stations
 Naval Ordnance Test Station (NOTS), China Lake, California

Photographic
 Naval Photographic Intelligence Center, Washington, D.C.
 Naval Photographic Science Laboratory, Anacostia

Powder facilities
 Naval Powder Factory, Indian Head, Maryland

Proving Grounds
 Naval Proving Ground, Dahlgren, Virginia

Radio

Activities
 Naval Radio Activities, Bainbridge Island, Port Blakely, Washington

Stations
 Naval Radio Station, Annapolis, Maryland
 Naval Radio Station, Naval Air Station, Astoria, Oregon
 Naval Radio Station, Boston, Massachusetts
 Naval Radio Station, Chatham, Massachusetts
 Naval Radio Station, Cheltenham, Maryland
 Naval Radio Station, Jupiter, Florida (aka Station J)
 Naval Radio Station, Keyport, Washington
 Naval Radio Station, New Orleans, Louisiana
 Naval Radio Station, San Juan, Puerto Rico

Stations
 Naval Station, Astoria, Oregon
 Naval Station, Middle and Orchard Points, Manchester, Washington
 Naval Station, Midway Island
 Naval Station, Portland, Maine
 Naval Station, Seattle, Washington
 Naval Station, Tutuila, Samoa
 Naval Station, Wake Island

Storehouses
 Naval Storehouse, Port Covington Terminal, Baltimore, Maryland

Submarine Operations
 Naval Submarine Base, New London, Connecticut
 Naval Submarine Base, Saint Thomas, US Virgin Islands
 Naval Submarine School, New London, Connecticut

Radio stations
 Naval Supplementary Radio Station, Chatham, Massachusetts
 Naval Supplementary Radio Station, Mansett (Seawall) Maine

Supplies

Corps Schools
 Naval Supply Corps School, Graduate School of Business Administration, Harvard University, Boston, Massachusetts
 Naval Supply Corps School, Graduate School of Business Administration (Radcliff Branch), Harvard University, Boston, Massachusetts
 Naval Supply Corps School, Wellesley College, Wellesley, Massachusetts

Depots
 Naval Supply Depot, Bayonne Annex, Bayonne, New Jersey
 Naval Supply Depot, Clearfield, Utah
 Naval Supply Depot, New Orleans, Louisiana
 Naval Supply Depot, Seattle, Washington
 Naval Supply Depot, Spokane, Washington

Piers
 Naval Supply Pier, Casco Bay

Torpedo Stations
 Naval Torpedo Station, Alexandria, Virginia
 Naval Torpedo Station, Keyport, Washington
 Naval Torpedo Station, Newport, Rhode Island

Training

Commands
 Naval Air Training Command (NATC)

Centers
 Naval Training Center Bainbridge, Maryland
 Naval Training Center, Boston, Massachusetts
 Naval Training Center, Farragut, Idaho
 Naval Training Center, Great Lakes, Illinois
 Naval Training Center, Naval Repair Base, New Orleans, Louisiana
 Naval Training Center, Portland, Maine

Schools
 Naval Training School (Aircraft Carrier Gasoline Systems), Manchester, Washington
 Naval Training School (Armed Guard Gunnery), New Orleans, Louisiana
 Naval Training School (Armed Guard Gunnery), Seattle, Washington
 Naval Training School (Ammunition Handling), Lake Union, Seattle, Washington
 Naval Training School (Amphibious Firemen), Iowa State College, Ames, Iowa
 Naval Training School (Aviation Communications), NATTC, Memphis, Tennessee
 Naval Training School (Aviation Engineering Officer), NATTC, Memphis, Tennessee
 Naval Training School (Aviation Radiomen), NATTC, Memphis, Tennessee
 Naval Training School (Basic Engineering), Hampton, Virginia
 Naval Training School (Carpenter's Mates), Hampton, Virginia
 Naval Training School (Communications), Harvard University, Cambridge, Massachusetts
 Naval Training School (Communication WR), Mt. Holyoke College, South Hadley, Massachusetts
 Naval Training School (Cooks & Bakers), Naval Reserve Armory, Indianapolis, Indiana
 Naval Training School (Destroyer Escort), Cleveland, Ohio
 Naval Training School (Diesel), Cleveland, Ohio
 Naval Training School (Diesel), Fairbanks Morse Co., Beloit, Wisconsin
 Naval Training School (Diesel), Hampton, Virginia
 Naval Training School (Diesel), Nordberg Mfg. Co., Milwaukee, Wisconsin
 Naval Training School (Direction Finders & Loran), Naval Station, Portland, Maine
 Naval Training School (Electrical), Bainbridge, Maryland
 Naval Training School (Electrical), Hampton, Virginia
 Naval Training School (Electronics), Boston, Massachusetts
 Naval Training School (Electronics), New Orleans, Louisiana
 Naval Training School (Elementary Electricity and Radio Material), Takoma Park, Maryland
 Naval Training School (Elementary Electricity and Radio Material), Stillwater, Oklahoma
 Naval Training School (Fire-Control-Advanced), Washington, D.C.
 Naval Training School (Fire Controlmen), Bainbridge, Maryland
 Naval Training School (Fire Fighters Modified), New Orleans, Louisiana
 Naval Training School (Gunner's Mates), Naval Reserve Armory, Michigan City, Indiana
 Naval Training School, Harvard University, Cambridge, Massachusetts
 Naval Training School (Instructors), Bainbridge, Maryland
 Naval Training School (Line Maintenance-JRM), Middle River, Maryland
 Naval Training School (Loran), New Orleans, Louisiana
 Naval Training School, Hampton Institute, Hampton, Virginia
 Naval Training School (Indoctrination & Communications), Harvard University, Cambridge, Massachusetts
 Naval Training School (Japanese Language), University of Colorado
 Naval Training School (Laundry), Anacostia, D.C
 Naval Training School (Line Maintenance), NAS, Astoria, Oregon
 Naval Training School (Line Maintenance PBM), NAS, Astoria, Ore
 Naval Training School (Loran), Boston, Massachusetts
 Naval Training School (Machinist's Mates & Metalsmiths), Boston, Massachusetts
 Naval Training School (Machinist Mate), Wentworth Institute, Boston, Massachusetts
 Naval Training School (Motion Picture Operators), Bainbridge, Maryland
 Naval Training School, NAS, Quonset Point, Rhode Island
 Naval Training School (Navigation), M.I.T., Cambridge, Massachusetts
 Naval Training School (Officers Cooks and Stewards), Annapolis, Maryland
 Naval Training School (Oxygen Generation), Boston, Massachusetts
 Naval Training School (Physical Instructors), Bainbridge, Maryland
 Naval Training School (Pre-Radar), Bowdoin College, Brunswick, Maine
 Naval Training School (Pre-Radar), Harvard University, Cambridge, Massachusetts
 Naval Training School (Pre-Radio Material), Michigan City, Indiana
 Naval Training School (Radar), M.I.T., Boston, Massachusetts
 Naval Training School (radio), Bainbridge Island, Puget Sound, Washington
 Naval Training School (Radio), Bainbridge, Maryland
 Naval Training School (Radio), Naval Reserve Armory, Indianapolis, Indiana
 Naval Training School (Radio-Special), Bainbridge Island, Port Blakely, Washington
 Naval Training School (Radio-Women), University of Wisconsin, Madison, Wisconsin
 Naval Training School (Radio-W), Miami University, Oxford, Ohio
 Naval Training School (Recruit Instructors - C), Bainbridge, Maryland
 Naval Training School (Signals), Butler University, Indianapolis, Indiana
 Naval Training School (Sound Motion Picture Technician), Bainbridge, Maryland
 Naval Training School (Turbo-Jet), NATTC, Memphis, Tennessee
 Naval Training School, University of Wisconsin, Madison, Wisconsin
 Naval Training School (Yeoman, Signal and Storekeepers), Toledo, Ohio
 Naval Training Schools, Iowa State College, Ames, Iowa
 Naval Training Schools, M.I.T., Cambridge, Massachusetts
 Naval Training Schools, University of Colorado
 Naval Training Schools (Yeoman) and (Storekeepers), Hampton, Virginia
 Naval Training Station, Newport, Rhode Island

Units
 Naval Training Unit, Berea College, Berea, Kentucky
 Naval Training Unit (Line Maintenance JM-1), Middle River, Maryland

Units
 Naval Unit, Air Technical Document Research Unit, Camp Ritchie, Maryland
 Naval Unit, Edgewood Arsenal, Edgewood, Maryland
 Naval Unit, Special Projects Division, Chemical Warfare Service, Camp Detrick. Frederick, Maryland
 Naval Unit, Special Projects Division, Chemical Warfare Service, Terre Haute, Indiana
 Naval Unit, Western Chemical Warfare School, Rocky Mountain Arsenal, Colorado

Miscellaneous
 Naval Electronics Laboratory, San Diego, California
 Naval Engineering Experiment Station, Annapolis, Maryland
 Naval Fire Fighter's School, Navy Yard, Boston, Massachusetts
 Naval Flight Test Center, Cedar Point, Maryland
 Naval Frontier Base, Boston, Massachusetts
 Naval Radio Station, Winter Harbor, Maine
 Naval Radio Transmitting Station, Bainbridge Island, Washington
 Naval Recreation Camp, East Brewster, Massachusetts
 Naval Regimental Officers Training Corps, New Orleans, Louisiana
 Naval Repair Base, New Orleans, Louisiana
 Naval Research Laboratory, Washington, D.C
 Naval Reserve Educational Center, New Orleans, Louisiana
 Naval Routing Office, Baltimore, Maryland
 Naval Section Base, Lockwood Basin, Boston, Massachusetts
 Naval Senior Advisor to the War Production Board, Boston, Massachusetts

References

 

Shore activities
World War II, shore activities
World War II, Navy shore activities
Navy shore activities